Blast from the Past is a 1999 American romantic comedy science fiction film directed by Hugh Wilson and starring Brendan Fraser, Alicia Silverstone, Christopher Walken, Sissy Spacek, and Dave Foley.

The film focuses on a naive 35-year-old man, Adam Webber, who has spent his entire life (1962-1997) living in a Cold War-era fallout shelter built by his survivalist, anti-Communist father, who believes the United States has suffered a Soviet nuclear attack (in reality, a plane crashed into their house). When the doors unlock after 35 years (the amount of time his father believes the nuclear fallout will take to clear), Adam emerges into the modern world, where his innocence and old-fashioned views put him at comedic odds with others.

The film received mixed reviews from critics and was a box office disappointment.

Plot
In 1962, eccentric American scientist Dr. Calvin Webber believes nuclear war with the Soviet Union is imminent, and builds a secret fallout shelter beneath his backyard. Alarmed by the Cuban Missile Crisis, Calvin takes his pregnant wife Helen into the shelter; when an unexpected mechanical failure aboard an F-86 Sabre causes the aircraft to crash into the house above, Calvin assumes the worst and activates the shelter’s time-locks for 35 years. With the house completely destroyed by the crash, the Webbers' neighbors and authorities assume they were killed, and their property is left abandoned.

Helen gives birth to Adam, who is educated to a high standard by his father (including becoming fluent in several languages), and grows up on 1950s-era pop culture like I Love Lucy and The Honeymooners, and pop standards by Perry Como and Dean Martin. Above ground, a diner opens in 1965, where Melker works for Mom as a soda jerk. The diner becomes a pizzeria, then a punk club named Purgatory, as the suburban neighborhood deteriorates over the decades into an inner city ghetto. By 1995, Melker is an alcoholic living in the diner's condemned remains.

When the shelter unlocks in 1999, Calvin mistakes the now-blighted neighborhood for a post-apocalyptic wasteland of irradiated mutants, and decides the family must stay underground, over the objections of Helen, who, unlike Calvin (who enjoys the seclusion) and Adam (who knows nothing else), has never taken to living in the shelter. With supplies running out and Calvin falling ill, Adam leaves the shelter for the first time. He meets Melker, who had encountered Calvin the previous night, bursting through the floor in his radiation suit. Melker immediately begins to worship Adam as a god. Marveling at the outside world, Adam purchases supplies, but then cannot remember his way back to the elevator.

Trying to sell his father's classic baseball cards at a hobby shop, Adam meets Eve Rustikov, who stops the store owner from cheating Adam and is fired. Eve drives Adam to a Holiday Inn in exchange for a rare card, but returns the next morning out of guilt. Adam asks her to help purchase supplies. Unaware of the value of money, Adam agrees to her request for $1,000 a week, while also asking Eve to help him find a wife  who is "not a mutant" and is from Pasadena, California, per his mother's advice. Adam meets Eve's gay housemate and best friend Troy, who provides him with advice and a fashion makeover.
 
Eve and Troy take Adam to a 1940s swing-style nightclub to find him a wife. Adam attracts the attention of several women, including Eve's nemesis Sophie. Jealous, Eve reconnects with her ex-boyfriend Cliff, who goads Adam into an altercation, relenting when Adam demonstrates his boxing skills, having trained every day with his father. Eve leaves. Troy returns home and explains Adam went home with Sophie. Adam returns, explaining that he politely rejected Sophie's advances, as he could only think about Eve. He and Eve kiss, but when Adam admits the truth about his past and his desire to take her to be his wife "underground", she asks him to leave.

Finding the pub, where Melker preaches to a full congregation, Adam returns to Eve's house, where she is waiting with Dr. Nina Aron and her assistant to have him committed. Initially cooperating, Adam escapes asking Eve and Troy to collect his things and pay his hotel bill. In his hotel room, Troy and Eve find toiletries and clothing from the 1960s and absurdly valuable stock certificates in companies like IBM (which Calvin had written off as "worthless"), and deduce that Adam is not crazy and was telling the truth the whole time.

As Melker and his cult load supplies into the shelter, Calvin prepares to seal his family inside again. Eve spots Adam outside the pub; they embrace, and Adam takes her to meet his parents. Impressed with Eve, Calvin and Helen agree to set the shelter's locks for two months while Adam and Eve make arrangements.

During this time, Adam and Eve sell the stocks to build his parents a new home in the country, identical to their house that was destroyed, and purchase and restore a red 1960 Cadillac convertible. They help Melker rebuild the pub into a '50s-themed nightclub after convincing him that Adam is not God.

Adam reveals there was never an atomic war, the "bomb" was not a bomb and instead was a plane that had crashed into their house,  and that the Soviet Union collapsed peacefully, ending the Cold War. Unconvinced, Calvin plans to build a new fallout shelter as Eve watches while playing with her engagement ring.

Cast

Reception

Critical reception
The film received mixed reviews from critics. On Rotten Tomatoes, the film has an overall score of 58% of the comments positive based on 81 reviews, with the consensus: "Cute idea, but not consistently funny". On Metacritic has a score of 48%. Roger Ebert gave the film three out of four stars saying "the movie is funny and entertaining in all the usual ways, yes, but I was grateful that it tried for more: that it was actually about something, that it had an original premise, that it used satire and irony and had sly undercurrents."

Box office
Blast from the Past opened in North American theaters on February 12, 1999 and took in $7,771,066 earning it 5th place at the box office for the weekend. It ultimately made a profit, grossing $40.3 million worldwide against its $35 million budget despite only grossing $26.5 million within the United States.

Soundtrack
"A Little Belief" – Celeste Prince
"Honey Please" – Sonichrome
"I See the Sun" – Tommy Henriksen
"I Will Buy You a New Life" – Everclear
"Round and Round" – Perry Como
"It's the End of the World as We Know It (And I Feel Fine)" – R.E.M.
"Mr. Zoot Suit" – Ingrid Lucia And The Flying Neutrinos
"Political Science" – Randy Newman
"Pretty Babies" – Dishwalla
"So Long Toots" – Cherry Poppin' Daddies
"Trou Macacq" – Squirrel Nut Zippers
"Drawing Flies" – Soundgarden

See also
 Encino Man

References

External links
 
 
 
 

1998 films
1998 romantic comedy films
American comedy-drama films
American fantasy films
American romantic comedy films
1990s English-language films
Films about the Cuban Missile Crisis
Films directed by Hugh Wilson
Films scored by Steve Dorff
Films set in 1962
Films set in the 1970s
Films set in the 1980s
Films set in 1995
Films set in 1999
Films with screenplays by Hugh Wilson
New Line Cinema films
1990s American films
Films set in bunkers